James S. Stevenson (1780 – October 16, 1831) was a Jacksonian member of the U.S. House of Representatives from Pennsylvania.

James S. Stevenson was born in York County, Pennsylvania.  He studied law, was admitted to the bar and practiced.  He was a member of the Pennsylvania House of Representatives in 1822 and 1823.  He was president of the board of canal commissioners of the state, which position he held until the time of his death.

Stevenson was elected as a Jacksonian to the Nineteenth and Twentieth Congresses.  He was an unsuccessful candidate for reelection in 1828 to the Twenty-first Congress.  He was engaged in manufacturing in Pittsburgh, Pennsylvania, until his death in 1831.  Interment in First Presbyterian Cemetery.

Sources

The Political Graveyard

Members of the Pennsylvania House of Representatives
People from York County, Pennsylvania
American Presbyterians
1780 births
1831 deaths
Jacksonian members of the United States House of Representatives from Pennsylvania
19th-century American politicians